Glenn Townsend (born 24 April 1962) is an Australian water polo player who competed in the 1984 Summer Olympics, in the 1988 Summer Olympics, and in the 1992 Summer Olympics.

See also
 Australia men's Olympic water polo team records and statistics
 List of men's Olympic water polo tournament goalkeepers

References

External links
 

1962 births
Living people
Australian male water polo players
Water polo goalkeepers
Olympic water polo players of Australia
Water polo players at the 1984 Summer Olympics
Water polo players at the 1988 Summer Olympics
Water polo players at the 1992 Summer Olympics